Ram Sahai Tiwary was an Indian politician. He was elected to the lower House of Parliament, the Lok Sabha, from Khajuraho, Madhya Pradesh, India. He was a member of the Constituent Assembly of India representing Vindhya Pradesh.

References

External links
 Official biographical sketch in Parliament of India website

Year of birth missing
Year of death missing
India MPs 1952–1957
India MPs 1957–1962
India MPs 1962–1967
Indian National Congress politicians
Members of the Constituent Assembly of India